Football Federation of the 3rd Department Cordillera (Federación de Fútbol Tercer Departamento Cordillera) is the departamental governing body of football (soccer) in the department of Cordillera, in Paraguay. The federation is responsible for the organization of football leagues in the different cities of the department and it is also the regulator of the clubs. The main office of this federation is located in the city of Caacupé.

Tournaments for each league of this federation are played every year to determine the best teams. Afterwards, the champions of each league face each other to determine the best team in the department, with the overall winner being promoted to a higher division in the Paraguayan football league system.

Leagues in Cordillera

Liga Alteña de Fútbol
The Liga Alteña de Fútbol is based in the city of Altos. The following teams are part of this league:
 Porvenir Alteño
 12 de Junio
 8 de Setiembre
 Libertad
 24 de Mayo
 Independiente
 Sol de Mayo FBC
 14 de Mayo
 Sportivo Acosta Ñú
 General Aquino
 Juventud Unido
 1 de Marzo
 Guaraní
 Juventud Guaraní
 1 de Mayo
 Sportivo Ytagasa
 General Bernardino Caballero

Liga Arroyense de Fútbol
The Liga Arroyense de Fútbol is based in the city of Arroyos y Esteros. The following teams are part of this league:
 A.S. Manduvirá
 Paraguayos Unidos
 General Díaz
 13 de Junio
 Guaraní
 Cerro Porteño
 8 de Diciembre
 12 de Junio FBC
 Primavera
 Sportivo Curupayty
 Cabo Luciano Locio
 San Luis FBC
 Olimpia
 Mariscal López
 Cerro Corá
 27 de Noviembre
 12 de Octubre
 Tte. Porfirio Saldivar
 General B. Caballero FBC
 Nacional
 26 de Julio
 Cabo Jose V. Recalde

Liga Atyreña de Deportes
The Liga Atyreña de Deportes is based in the city of Atyrá. The following teams are part of this league:
 4 de Octubre
 Sportivo Atyreño
 3 de Febrero
 Tte. A. Rojas Silva
 Coronel Ojeda
 6 de Enero
 Humaitá FBC
 5 de Abril
 Nacional
 Olimpia
 Cerro Porteño
 Cerro Corá
 29 de Setiembre
 16 de Agosto
 13 de Junio
 Sportivo Primavera
 Alianza Central
 Capitan Vallejos
 3 de Mayo
 12 de Agosto
 Guaraní FBC
 Maracaná
 24 de Junio

Liga Barrereña de Deportes
The Liga Barrereña de Deportes is based in the city of Eusebio Ayala. The following teams are part of this league:
 Acosta Ñú
 Sportivo Barrereña
 Sportivo Aguaity
 Capitan Garcia Rivardi
 Cerro Corá
 Flor de Mayo
 General Diaz
 General Caballero
 Libertad
 Cnel. Gómez
 Sportivo Rubio Ñú
 6 de Enero
 Curupaity
 24 de Mayo
 Tte. A. Rojas Silva
 Union Pacifico
 Presidente Franco
 3 de Febrero
 24 de Junio

Liga Caacupeña de Deportes
The Liga Caacupeña de Deportes is based in the city of Caacupé. The following teams are part of this league:
 15 de Agosto
 20 de Julio
 1 de Enero
 12 de Octubre
 Acosta Ñú
 25 de Setiembre
 12 de Junio
 Sportivo Guarani
 Tte. Jose M. Fariña
 Sportivo Barrio Loma
 Sportivo Caacupemi
 Tte. Jose Auino 
 Juventud Cordillerana
 Sportivo Costa Alegre
 Atletico River Plate
 4 de Octubre
 6 de Enero
 Mariscal Lopez
 Sol de Mayo
 Union Paraguaya
 3 de Mayo
 General Diaz
 Cerro Cora
 Atletico Vista Alegre
 Aquidaban
 Cerro Cora
 Cerro Corona
 24 de Mayo
 Boca Juniors
 13 de Junio
 Libertad
 Sportivo Guaraní
 13 Tuyutí
 14 de Mayo
 8 de Diciembre
 Juventud Cordillerana
 15 de Mayo
 Sportivo Almadeño

Liga Caraguatay de Deportes
The Liga Caraguatay de Deportes is based in the city of Caraguatay. The following teams are part of this league:
 Sportivo Caraguatay
 Sportivo Alfonso Loma
 Norte América FBC
 Comandante Lara
 Cordillerano Central
 Atlético Independiente
 Jovenes Unidos
 Mcal. Lopez
 27 de Diciembre
 3 de Febrero
 6 de Julio
 12 de Junio FBC
 24 de Junio
 Guaraní

Liga Deportiva Cerro Corá
The Liga Deportiva Cerro Corá is based in the city of 1 de Marzo. The following teams are part of this league:
 Unión Obrera
 Sportivo 1 de Marzo
 Boquerón
 Juventud Unida
 Sol de América
 Nueva Estrella
 General Díaz FBC
 Tte. A. Rojas Silva
 Nacional FBC
 Sportivo Yhaguy

Liga Cordillerana de Deportes
The Liga Cordillerana de Deportes is based in the city of Isla Pucú. The following teams are part of this league:
 Sportivo Isla Pucú
 Mcal. Lopez
 Cerro Cora
 Costa Rica
 FBC 14 de Mayo
 Cerro Leon
 15 de Mayo
 16 de Agosto
 Tuyutí S.D.
 24 de Junio

Liga Emboscadeña de Deportes
The Liga Emboscadeña de Deportes is based in the city of Emboscada. The following teams are part of this league:
 Guanahani
 Sol de América
 22 de Setiembre
 Cerro Corá
 General Genes
 S.D. San Agustín
 Sportivo Colombia
 24 de Junio
 S y D 6 de Enero

Liga Deportiva Nueva Colombia
The Liga Deportiva Nueva Colombia is based in the city of Nueva Colombia. The following teams are part of this league:
 Juventud Unido
 1 de Enero
 Mcal. Lopez
 6 de Enero
 Guaraní
 15 de Agosto FBC
 Nanawa FBC
 Olimpia
 Cerro Porteño FC
 Union Escobar FBC

Liga Deportiva Piribebuy
The Liga Deportiva Piribebuy is based in the city of Piribebuy. The following teams are part of this league:
 12 de Agosto
 Humaitá FBC
 Atletico Independiente
 Cap. Fabriciano Cristaldo
 Guaraní
 Sol de Mayo
 Sportivo Union
 Sportivo San Blas
 Juventud Cordillerana
 Mcal. Estigarribia
 13 de Junio
 15 de Agosto
 3 de Febrero

Liga de Fútbol San Bernardino
The Liga de Fútbol San Bernardino is based in the city of San Bernardino. The following teams are part of this league:
 Nacional
 Atletico Juventud
 24 de Setiembre
 12 de Junio
 12 de Junio
 Sol de Mayo
 20 de Julio
 Cap. Ferreira
 12 de Octubre
 3 de Febrero
 Atletico 3 de Febrero

Liga Deportiva San José Obrero
The Liga Deportiva San José Obrero is based in the city of San José Obrero. The following teams are part of this league:
 Sol de America
 4 de Agosto 
 Deportiv San Jose Obrero
 Mayor Infante Rivarola
 29 de Junio
 Atletico Porvenir
 Deportivo Héroes del Chaco
 Tte. Chena Molinas
 Deportivo Alfonsino
 Libertad

Liga Tobateña de Deportes
The Liga Tobateña de Deportes is based in the city of Tobatí. The following teams are part of this league:
 Cap. Pedro Juan Caballero
 Porvenir
 15 de Mayo FBC
 Juventud Tobateña
 6 de Enero
 6 de Enero
 Libertad
 Teniente Brozzon
 Rubio Ñú
 4 de Setiembre
 Sportivo 4 Vientos
 Triunfo
 Sportivo 24 de Julio
 24 de Mayo
 20 de Enero

Liga Deportiva del Yhaguy
The Liga Deportiva del Yhaguy is based in the city of Itacurubí de la Cordillera. The following teams are part of this league:
 1 de Enero 
 Sportivo Santa Clara
 5 de Octubre
 General Escobar
 Capitan Aguilera
 Sportivo Valenzolano
 Cordillerano
 Nacional
 Centro Juvenil San Roqueño
 30 de Agosto
 4 de Julio

External links
 UFI Website

Cordillera
Cordillera Department